The Hand of Fate is the fourth album by artist Amanda Perez, released on October 13, 2007. Amanda Perez released two songs related to the album, "Radio" and "Don't Wanna Love You", on her personal Myspace page.

Track listing
"Don't Deserve You" (3:42)
"Candy Kisses" (4:11)
"Come Home" (4:13)
"Never Find NoBody Like Me" (4:20)
Please (4:21)
"Goodbye (Song for My Mother)" (4:11)
"Why" (3:27)
"Rain" (3:53)
"24's" (3:40)
"Feel Good" (3:53)
"These Arms" (4:47)
"It's Too Late" (4:30)

Singles
"Candy Kisses" (2007) (Bubbling Under Hot 100 Singles #10)

Credits
Carlos Fernandez: Art Direction, Design, Photography
James Hoover: Mixing 
John Lopez: Executive Producer
Hal Fitzgerald: Mixing 
Amanda Perez: Producer, Executive Producer

References

2007 albums
Amanda Perez albums